Ngua Nam Thum was a king of Sukhothai, an ancient kingdom in Thailand. He was from the House of Phra Ruang.

Preceded by Loe Thai, he possibly ascended the throne of Sukhothai in 1866 BE (1323/24 CE). He reigned until his death, which possibly took place in 1890 BE (1347/48 CE). Upon his death, he was succeeded by Mahathammaracha I (Lue Thai).

Name

Ngua Nam Thum (archaic ; modern) is the name that appears in the Pu Khun Chit Khun Chot Inscription (Inscription No. 45), created in 1935 BE (1392/93 CE).

The name, which means "Nam Thum the Fifth Son", indicates that he was the fifth son. Ngua is an archaic title given to a fifth son. Nam Thum is from either a Northern Thai subdialect or the Shan language, corresponding to nam thuam in Central Thai, meaning "inundation".

There are several suggestions about the origin of the name:
 Prasoet Na Nakhon, a Royal Society fellow in the field of history, suggested that Ngua Nam Thum was possibly a descendant of King Si Nao Nam Thum of Sukhothai, owing to the ancient custom of naming a baby after its ancestor. This possibility also gives rise to a suggestion that Sueang, Ngua Nam Thum's paternal grandmother, was a daughter of Si Nao Nam Thum.
 Wina Rotchanaratha (วีณา โรจนราธา), an expert from the Fine Arts Department, expressed the opinion that he got this name possibly because he was killed in a flood or died from drowning. Wina cited Jinakalamali which refers to a Sukhothai king in Pali as Udakajotthata, meaning the "drowned king", and the Chronicle of the North which says a Sukhothai king went to take a bath in the Yom River at the Grand Mire (แก่งหลวง; now the location of the Si Satchanalai Historical Park) and was carried away by a flood and never seen again. She said the two documents may refer to Ngua Nam Thum, but this cannot yet be confirmed due to conflicting genealogical and chronological details. She also introduced another possibility that he obtained the name because he was born during a flooding season. She cited an example in the Chronicle of Chiang Mai, which says a grandson of King Mangrai was called Pho-thao Nam Thuam ("Prince Inundation") because he was born when the kingdom was undergoing a deluge.

Life

A historical document, Jinakalamali, says Ngua Nam Thum was a son of Ban Mueang, a king of Sukhothai.

The Pu Khun Chit Khun Chot Inscription, which describes the lineage of the House of Phra Ruang, lists Ngua Nam Thum after Loe Thai and before Mahathammaracha I (Lue Thai). Historians therefore suggested that he was king of Sukhothai after Loe Thai and before Lue Thai. Loe Thai was a son of Ram Khamhaeng, the younger brother of Ngua Nam Thum's father, whilst Lue Thai was a son of Loe Thai.

The year of Ngua Nam Thum's accession to the throne is possibly 1866 BE (1323/24 CE), according to the calculation of Prasoet Na Nakhon.

It appears from historical sources that Ngua Nam Thum, after becoming king of Sukhothai, appointed Lue Thai as uparaja of Sukhothai (heir to the throne of Sukhothai and ex officio ruler of Si Satchanalai). The Wat Pa Mamuang Inscriptions (Inscriptions Nos. 4–5) say Lue Thai had ruled Si Satchanalai for a total of 22 years before entering the monkhood in 1905 BE (1362/63 CE). The year Lue Thai was appointed uparaja is therefore 1883 BE (1340/41 CE).

The Wat Pa Mamuang Inscriptions also say that, in 1890 BE (1347/48 CE), Lue Thai marched his men from Si Satchanalai to the capital Sukhothai and broke into the palace where he "killed all his enemies" before assuming the throne of Sukhothai. Prasoet Na Nakhon suggested that Ngua Nam Thum died in that year and would be succeeded to the throne by his son, Lue Thai then staged a coup and took the throne for himself.

Ancestry

References

Bibliography

 
 
 
 
 

Kings of Sukhothai
Year of birth unknown
14th-century monarchs in Asia
Thai princes
14th-century Thai people
1347 deaths
Year of death uncertain